Maria Malvina Howard, Lady Howard of Effingham (née Gertler; 26 December 1912 – 2000), often known as Manci Howard, was a Hungarian adventuress.

Maria Malvina Gertler was born in Budapest, the daughter of Ferenz Joseph Gertler. She went to England in 1935, and in 1938 married Mowbray, Lord Howard of Effingham, who later became the 6th Earl of Effingham. Howard, who was bankrupt, was paid a lump sum and a retainer by Gertler's lover, Edward Stanislas Weisblatt, an arms dealer. Gertler joined the British Union of Fascists.

Even before the outbreak of the Second World War, she was suspected of espionage, and on 10 February 1941 was interned in Holloway Prison. She was released on 16 July 1941 for lack of conclusive proof against her. Her marriage to Howard was dissolved in 1945 or 1946. 
After Lady Howard was arrested and held in Holloway prison, she appealed, declaring: "There is nothing I would not do for this country." She was released three months later, as there was no evidence she knew of Weisblatt's suspected activities. Weisblatt was her lover before the war. After her divorce, she moved to Australia.

References

1912 births
2000 deaths
Hungarian emigrants to the United Kingdom
British emigrants to Australia
People detained under Defence Regulation 18B
Date of death missing
People from Budapest
British courtesy baronesses and ladies of Parliament